Remember... Dreams Come True was a display of fireworks at Disneyland commemorating the 50th anniversary of the park. The show featured fireworks, lower level pyrotechnics, isopar flame effects, projection mapping, lasers, searchlights and lighting set to the soundtracks of some of Disneyland's rides and shows. 

The show was produced by Walt Disney Creative Entertainment and directed by then Vice President of Parades and Spectaculars Steve Davison and fireworks' designer Eric Tucker.

The show went on hiatus November 2, 2014 to make way for the integration of a new fireworks system, and for "Disneyland's Diamond Celebration," which included the return of Fantasy in the Sky and the new Disneyland Forever fireworks. The show returned from this hiatus on February 3, 2017. The fireworks show went on another hiatus on April 7, 2018, to accommodate Pixar Fest and its Together Forever fireworks. The show returned from this hiatus on September 7, 2018, featuring the searchlights and projection technology developed for Disneyland Forever. In November 2018, it was announced that a new fireworks show titled Mickey's Mix Magic would replace it and open at Disneyland on January 18, 2019.

Show summary

Opening
Introduction - The introduction is provided by Julie Andrews. Andrews tells the audience about the importance of magic of Disneyland and the beauty of dreams, and introduces the "Wishes" fanfare and show's theme.
When You Wish Upon a Star -  Cinderella (Jennifer Hale), Snow White (Carolyn Gardner), Ariel (Jodi Benson), Peter Pan (Blayne Weaver), Pinocchio (Michael Welch), and Aladdin (Scott Weinger) all share their dreams and fondest wishes, accompanied by musical motif from their respective films: "A Dream Is a Wish Your Heart Makes", "I'm Wishing", "Part of Your World", "The Second Star to the Right", "I've Got No Strings", and "A Whole New World".
Tinker Bell's Flight - Tinker Bell flies out over Sleeping Beauty Castle as Walt Disney's original opening day dedication speech for Disneyland (and the "Wishes" theme) plays.

Main Street U.S.A.
The original announcement from the Disneyland Railroad is heard, as is the whistle and bell of DLRR #1, C.K. Holliday. Then music from Main Street, U.S.A. such as Maple Leaf Rag and Main Street Electrical Parade is heard. The "old world" segment shows the Main Street Station and American Flag bunting is projected onto Sleeping Beauty Castle. Then, the American Flag itself is projected while the stars move upon it. The Main Street Electrical Parade's closing fanfare plays and exploding multicolor stars emanate from the center of the castle.

 Music
 Maple Leaf Rag by Scott Joplin
 "Baroque Hoedown" written by Jean-Jacques Perrey and Gershon Kingsley
 "Main Street Electrical Parade" arranged by Don Dorsey and Jack Wagner (electric version), and Gregory Smith (orchestral segment).

 Voices 
 Jack Wagner as the synthesized parade voice and the railroad announcer

Adventureland

Music from Walt Disney's Enchanted Tiki Room and the Indiana Jones Adventure are played. Colorful projections of the Tiki Room are featured on Sleeping Beauty's Castle with the birds featured in that attraction. During the Indiana Jones segment, the eye of Mara is projected onto the Matterhorn and the snake room of Indiana Jones Adventure is projected onto the castle. This section includes pyrotechnics.

Music
"The Tiki Tiki Tiki Room" (Richard M. Sherman, Robert B. Sherman)
"Raider's March" (John Williams)

Voices
Wally Boag as José
Fulton Burley as Michael
Ernie Newton as Pierre
Thurl Ravenscroft as Fritz
John Rhys-Davies as Sallah

New Orleans Square
Music from The Haunted Mansion and Pirates of the Caribbean are played. The exterior of the Haunted Mansion is projected onto the castle followed by the attraction's stretching room portraits. During the "Wicked Waltz," Madame Leota is projected floating around the castle as instruments are projected above her. At the end of the segment, Little Leota is projected as she says her trademark "Hurry back" spiel.

During the Pirates of the Caribbean segment, a skull is projected onto the castle and Matterhorn as flare fireworks are launched from the mountain's peak (after summer 2017, this effect was removed from the Matterhorn and flares were subsequently launched from atop the "Alice in Wonderland" show building). There is a "cannon fight" of diagonal fireworks between Fantasyland and Frontierland.

Music
"Grim Grinning Ghosts" (Buddy Baker, Xavier Atencio)
"Yo Ho (A Pirate's Life for Me)" (George Bruns, Atencio)

Voices
Paul Frees as the Ghost Host, the "dead men" pirate, and the Pirate Ship Captain
Eleanor Audley as Madame Leota
Leota Toombs as Little Leota

Frontierland
Music from Big Thunder Mountain Railroad and Rivers of America is played. During the Rivers of America scene, the Mark Twain Riverboat is projected steaming across the castle.

Songs
"Oh Shenandoah"
"The Ballad of Davy Crockett" (Until 2009) (Bruns, Tom W. Blackburn)
 "Main Title" from The Big Country (Until 2009) (Jerome Moross)

Voices
Dallas McKennon as the Prospector

Note: The Big Thunder Mountain Railroad portion of the show was removed in 2009.

Critter Country, Fantasyland, Toontown (Laughin' Place)
Music and sounds from various rides in Critter Country, Fantasyland, and Mickey's Toontown are heard. Attractions featured include (in order) Splash Mountain, Peter Pan's Flight, Alice in Wonderland, Casey Jr. Circus Train, Mad Tea Party, Roger Rabbit's Car Toon Spin, Country Bear Vacation Hoedown, The Many Adventures of Winnie the Pooh, It's a Small World, and America Sings. 

The segment starts with the voices of Splash Mountain's buzzards asking if the audience has found their "laughin' place." Splash Mountain is projected onto the castle. From there, Peter Pan flies across it with the Darling children. The Mad Hatter and March Hare are then heard as colored bubbles are projected, followed by the projection of Casey Jr. Circus Train. Benny the Cab introduces the second half of the segment, Saxons spin next to the castle, and a spiral is projected onto it followed by a barrage of rainbow-colored lights dancing across it. Finally, the weasel says, "Pop goes the weasel," and the segment ends with a door slamming shut and everything fades to darkness.

Music
Ev'rybody Has a Laughing Place (Allie Wrubel, Ray Gilbert)
The Unbirthday Song (Mack David, Al Hoffman, Jerry Livingston)
"Second Hungarian Rhapsody" (Liszt)
"Infernal Galop" from Orpheus in the Underworld (Jacques Offenbach)

Voices
Edward Conor and John Kelfreese as the Splash Mountain vultures
Dallas McKennon as the maniacal laughter voice over sound effects
Ed Wynn as the Mad Hatter
Bobby Driscoll as Peter Pan
 Margaret Wright as Casey Junior
Jerry Colonna as the March Hare
Charles Fleischer as Roger Rabbit and Benny the Cab
Mike West as Max the Buck
Thurl Ravenscroft as Buff the Buffalo
Frank Welker as Melvin the Moose
Jim Cummings as Tigger
Jack Wagner's announcement from the Matterhorn Bobsleds: "Remain seated please. Permanecer sentados por favor!"

Tomorrowland
Sound effects, narration, projections, and music from Space Mountain, Submarine Voyage, Autopia, Rocket Jets, PeopleMover, Adventure Thru Inner Space and Star Tours are played. 

Many Tomorrowland attractions and show scenes are projected onto the castle including the Rocket Jets, Submarine Voyage, Adventures Thru Inner Space, The Peoplemover, and Autopia. The main part of the segment is centered around Star Tours, with the logo being projected to start the scene. As the Star Wars theme plays, the effect of jumping to hyperspace is shown. Then, TIE Fighters are projected on the castle with a starry background. Green lasers are projected from the castle during this segment. 

Music
"Star Wars: Main Theme" (John Williams)

Voices
Paul Frees as the Scientist
Brian Cummings as the Star Tours announcer
Paul Reubens as RX-24 (Rex)
Steve Gawley as Red Leader

Conclusion
The conclusion is also provided by Julie Andrews. She tells the audience that Disneyland has grown to become the "Happiest Place on Earth." Tinker Bell returns to fly over the castle as a reprise of "Wishes" and "When You Wish Upon A Star" plays. The show ends in a cavalcade of fireworks as Andrews says, "Remember...Dreams Come True!". 

After the show, the song "Remember When" performed by LeAnn Rimes is played throughout the park. This song was the official song of the Happiest Homecoming on Earth, celebrating the 50th anniversary of Disneyland and Disney Parks worldwide.

Revisions 
At the conclusion of the show, "Remember When," written by Richard Marx and performed by LeAnn Rimes is played throughout the park. Later during the second season of running the fireworks show, a second song, Wishes!, performed by Peabo Bryson and Kimberley Locke (from the album Disney Wishes!) was added to play after "Remember When." After both songs, the lands' normal area loop music returns.

Although "Remember When" and "Wishes!" are exit music(s) of this show, this portion was occasionally altered due to special occasions:
 Prior to the introduction of Disney's Celebrate America in 2008, there was a special Independence Day fireworks finale every July 4th, namely A Salute to America's Golden Dreams, replacing two exit music(s) in their regular version. This theme song was borrowed from Epcot's The American Adventure and Disneyland's Great Moments with Mr. Lincoln attractions. This special show used a combination of former Believe and Remember... pyro equipment.
 For the 2005 holiday season, "Remember When" was replaced with the "White Christmas" segment of Believe... In Holiday Magic, complete with magical snowfall. This version of the "White Christmas" segment contained a short introduction by Julie Andrews.
In acknowledgment that Disneyland became more than 50 years old, later showings changed Julie Andrews' narration to: "Fifty years ago" being replaced with "in 1955," and "Fifty years later" being dubbed over with the word "today."

Additional information 
This fireworks show was also used during the 2006 and 2007 Grad Nite programs. The show itself remained almost unchanged except for the soundtrack being replaced with one consisting primarily of contemporary music (different each year) and projection to match it. The show was renamed to Grad Nite Explosion for these events and ran for 10 minutes at 1:00am and 3:00am. Video screens along with additional lighting effects were also added on either side of the hub (already in place as part of Club KIIS).

The entire soundtrack to the show can be found on A Musical History of Disneyland and The Official Album of the Disneyland Resort. The soundtrack reappeared on the Official Album for the Year of a Million Dreams with new narration to coincide with the end of the 50th Anniversary. The score was arranged by Greg Smith.

The music used during the opening and finale of Remember... Dreams Come True originated from Wishes: A Magical Gathering of Disney Dreams at the Magic Kingdom at Walt Disney World in Florida, which is performed by Charity Farris.

See also
Wishes: A Magical Gathering of Disney Dreams
Happily Ever After
Celebrate! Tokyo Disneyland - a similar, modern version to Remember, but with different music
Disney Dreams!
Ignite the Dream: A Nighttime Spectacular of Magic and Light
Disney in the Stars
List of former Disneyland attractions
List of Disneyland attractions

References

External links

 "Remember...Dreams Come True" Video and Pictures from LaughingPlace.com
 Disneyland Park - Remember... Dreams Come True

Disneyland
Walt Disney Parks and Resorts fireworks
Former Walt Disney Parks and Resorts attractions
Amusement park attractions introduced in 2005
Amusement park attractions that closed in 2009
Amusement park attractions introduced in 2010
Amusement park attractions introduced in 2017
Amusement park attractions that closed in 2014
Amusement park attractions that closed in 2018
Amusement park attractions that closed in 2019
Amusement park attractions introduced in 2018